Lashkargāh, historically called Bost or Boost, is a city in southwestern Afghanistan and the capital of Helmand Province. It is located in Lashkargah District, where the Arghandab River merges into the Helmand River. The city has a population of 201,546 as of 2006. Lashkargah is linked by major roads with Kandahar to the east, Zaranj on the border with Iran to the west, and Farah and Herat to the north-west. It is mostly very arid and desolate. However, farming does exist around the Helmand and Arghandab rivers. Bost Airport is located on the east bank of the Helmand River, five miles north of the junction of the Helmand and Arghandab rivers. Because of the trading hubs, it is Afghanistan's second largest city in size, after Kabul and before Kandahar.

After several weeks of fighting in the Battle of Lashkargah, the city was captured by the Taliban on 13 August 2021, becoming the fourteenth provincial capital to be seized by the Taliban as part of the wider 2021 Taliban offensive.

History 

Lashkargah means "army barracks" in Persian. The area was part of the Saffarids in the 9th century. It grew up a thousand years ago as a riverside barracks town for soldiers accompanying the Ghaznavid nobility to their grand winter capital of Bost. The ruins of the Ghaznavid mansions still stand along the Helmand River; the city of Bost and its outlying communities were sacked in successive centuries by the Ghorids, Mongols, and Timurids. However, the region was later rebuilt by Timur.

By the late 16th century the city and region was governed by the Safavid dynasty. It became part of the Afghan Hotaki Empire in 1709. It was invaded by the Afsharid forces in 1738 on their way to Kandahar. By 1747 it became part of the Durrani Empire or modern Afghanistan. The British arrived in or about 1840 during the First Anglo-Afghan War but left about year later. The city was used by Ayub Khan in the Second Anglo-Afghan War until 1880 when the British helped return it to Abdur Rahman Khan. It remained peaceful for the next 100 years. 

The modern city of Lashkargah was used as a headquarters for United States Army Corps of Engineers working on the Helmand Valley Authority (HVA) irrigation project in the 1950s, modeled after the Tennessee Valley Authority (TVA) in the United States. Lashkargah was built using American designs, with broad tree-lined streets and brick houses with no walls separating them from the street. In the wake of the Soviet invasion and the long Afghan civil war, the trees mostly came down and walls went up.

The massive Helmand irrigation project in the 1940s–1970s created one of the most extensive farming zones in southern Afghanistan, opening up many thousands of hectares of desert to human cultivation and habitation. The project focused on three large canals: the Boghra, Shamalan, and Darweshan. Responsibility for maintaining the canals was given to the Helmand and Arghandab Valley Authority (HAVA), a semi-independent government agency whose authority (in its heyday) rivaled that of the provincial governors.

After the withdrawal of Soviet forces from Afghanistan in 1989 and the collapse of Mohammad Najibullah's government in 1992, the city was taken over by the Mujaheddin forces. In the mid-1990s it fell to the Taliban government. In late 2001, the Taliban were removed from power by the United States armed forces. Since 2002, the city and region was occupied by United States Marine Corps and the International Security Assistance Force. In 2008, Taliban forces attacked the city heavily but the Afghan National Army and the Oregon Army National Guard managed to hold them back, as shown in the documentary, "Shepherds of Helmand." After training and equipping Afghan security forces, the foreign armies transferred security responsibility to the military of Afghanistan and Afghan National Police in 2011. The city has witnessed some fighting in the form of attacks orchestrated by the Taliban insurgents. In October 2020, the Taliban attacked the city along with the nearby district of Nad Ali. Militants raised the flag of the Islamic Emirate of Afghanistan at the city's eastern entrance but withdrew following a few days once the United States agreed to halt its airstrikes on the Taliban near Lashkargah. The city fell under Taliban control on 13 August 2021, after the Battle of Lashkargah.

Climate
Lashkargah has a hot desert climate (Köppen BWh), characterised by little precipitation and high variation between summer and winter temperatures. The average temperature in Lashkargah is 20.1 °C, while the annual precipitation averages 97 mm. Summers start in mid-May, last until late-September, and are extremely dry. July is the hottest month of the year with an average temperature of 32.8 °C. The coldest month January has an average temperature of 7.6 °C.

Helmand River

The Helmand River is the longest in Afghanistan with a length of 1,150 km. The river originates in the Hindu Kush and ends in Hamun-i-Helmand in the Sistan and Baluchistan province of neighboring Iran. One of the two primary arms of the river crosses through Lashkargah, giving it the attractive air of a riverside city. It makes for a pleasant setting for the citizens of Lashkargah to picnic. The river is deep enough at Lashkargah to allow for varied water sports, including swimming and boating. Boats are available for rent to the public. Mirwais Neka Park was recently built on the banks of the river. There is a large thicket located on the opposite side of the river from the city. Many types of trees and different species of birds, mammals, and reptiles inhabit the thicket.

Cultural and other places

The Ghaznavid Empire fortress of Lashkari Bazar is located on the outskirts of the city. To the south, the great fortress of Bost, Qala-e-Bost, remains an impressive ruin. It is located near the convergence of the Helmand and Arghandab Rivers, a half-hour's drive south of Lashkargah. Qala-e-Bost is famous for its decorative arch, which appears on the 100 Afghani note (Afghan currency). As of April 2008, it was possible to descend into an ancient shaft about 20 feet across and 200 feet deep, with a series of dark side rooms and a spiral staircase leading to the bottom. In 2006 construction began on a cobblestone road to lead from the south of Lashkargah to the Qala-e-Bost Arch (known to readers of James A. Michener's Caravans as Qala Bist.)
Mosques
Lashkargah Mosque
Parks
Mirwais Nika Park, located on the bank of the Helmand River
Mohammadd Rasul Akhondzada Park, located in center of the city
Baba-e-Millat Park is huge park which covers an area of seven hectares, and is located on the bank of Helmand river, on the outskirts of Lashkargah.
Park for Females

Population
The population of Lashkargah numbered approximately 201,546 as of 2006. In 2015 it has been estimated at 276,831.

Land use
Lashkargah is a Trading and Transit Hub in southern Afghanistan. As it is located at the confluence of the Helmand and Arghandab rivers, it is blessed with the most hectares of water (4,940 Ha) of any provincial capital in the country. Agriculture consequently accounts for the largest amount of land use (61%). Dwellings are clustered in the central districts.

Education and media

The level of education in Lashkargah had been very high during the 1960s and 70s before the Soviet Invasion and Civil War. The students were talented, active, and hard workers. They were always taking up good positions within the universities. There are around 27 schools, a teacher's training institute, an agricultural school, Lashkargah Technical, Agricultural and Veterinarian Institute 800 M past the Bolan Bridge founded in 2011, with Abdul Malek as dean. Lashkargah has a number of Higher educational institutions the Public Helmand University founded in 2008, with Soor Gul Sandakheel as Chancellor with a campus close to the Peace Square and a new Campus to be built close to Lashkargah with a construction budget of 1.5 million US$. Helmand University has four faculties, Agriculture, engineering, education and veterinarian.
The Bost Institute of higher education in Helmand Province is a private, non-sectarian institution of higher education founded in 1391–2012 in Lashkargah with courses in law, engineering and business administration. 
The Bost Agricultural university was registered with the Ministry of Higher Education in 2007, and was inaugurated by former governor of Helmand Province, Assadullah Wafa. Bost Agricultural University currently only provides education in the field of Agriculture. There are also many computer and English language courses in the city, and thousands of students are attending them.

Besides the activities of the Department of Culture and Information of Helmand Province, the youth are also actively involved in different cultural and educational activities. There are different cultural groups operating in Lashkargah, including: the Helmand Youth Organization, the Bost Cultural Society, the Allama Mahmud Tarzi Educational and Cultural Association, and the Helmand Cultural Group. There are also various cultural and educational websites which are made and updated by students and cultural organizations.
There is broad use of the media in Lashkargah. The use of Radio, Television, and Internet has significantly increased in the last decade. Several radio stations are broadcasting in Lashkargah, including Tamadoon Radio 90.6 FM, Sabawoon Radio, Samoon Radio, and Helmand Radio. Besides many other local Afghan and international TV channels, there is also a Bost Television channel broadcasting from Lashkargah.

Recent developments

The city of Lashkargah has undergone large scale development in the past few years with new roads, markets and residential areas constructed. Many Afghans continue to leave their tribes and emigrate towards cities – such as Lashkargah. Government projects distributed land to the people, increasing the approximate size of the city. Modern architecture and building methods are more common, now, here than Mud squats and other more traditional Afghan architecture. The former Governor of Helmand province, Gulab Mangal, funded large scale development of the city, the Governor's office and Justice Department have been recently renovated, new Police Headquarters and Eidgah have also been funded. Unlike much of Afghanistan the roads in Lashkargah are generally paved with asphalt. International Organizations and PRT in Lashkargah have helped to complete rehabilitation and infrastructure projects such as building: schools, roads and parks.

In 2005 it was announced that a USAID-funded project would build six reservoirs in Lashkargah, with responsibility for the water supply then being handed over to the Helmand and Arghandab Valley Authority. The city had been without fresh water for the previous 30 years due to the contamination of the Helmand River.

As part of Operation Moshtarak in 2010, the British Army and local workforces constructed Route Trident, a road to connect Lashkargah and the northern, more developed city of Gereshk,
Governor Mangal's efforts to restructure the city have left Route Trident underfunded, but highly ranked in the priority of rebuilding Lashkargah.

A current project in the city, to aid regeneration is the "Lashkargah Bost Airport and Agriculture Center".  This project will consist of constructing a new agricultural center, an Industrial Park and will repair, upgrade and modernise Bost Airport through renovation projects.

Sports

Football and cricket are the most popular sports in the area. The Lashkargah Football Stadium was rebuilt in 2006 and has a capacity of more around 10,000 spectators. Currently, 13 registered cricket teams are playing at the new Karzai Stadium in Lashkargah, which was completed in the summer of 2009.

Bodybuilding has also attracted the youth of Lashkargah. There are several gymnasiums in the city. Aziz Ahmad Nikyar gained the title of Mr. Afghanistan in 2006, and also participated in the 2006 Asian Games representing AfghanistanOther popular sports in Lashkargah are Taekwondo, Boxing, Snooker, Volleyball.

Drugs
According to a BBC programme which interviewed an American-born Afghan, whose father worked on the irrigation project, it was envisaged to create agriculture, but in recent times contributed to the growth of opium poppy farming.

Notable people

 

Abu al-Fath al-Busti (942-1010), Persian secretary and famous poet  
Muhammad ibn Hibban al-Busti (c. 884–965), Muslim scholar  
Ehsan Aman (b. 1959), singer
Hassan Maymandi, 10th century governor of Bust under Ghaznavid ruler Sabuktigin

See also 
List of cities in Afghanistan
International Security Assistance Force
Provincial Reconstruction Team

References and footnotes

External links 

Lashkar Gah municipality
Helmand Landscape Pictures

Populated places in Helmand Province
Provincial capitals in Afghanistan
Cities in Afghanistan
Populated places with period of establishment missing